Andreas Melanarkitis(born 15 March 1975) is a former international Cypriot football defender.

He started his career in 1995 from Anorthosis Famagusta. He played in many teams such as Nea Salamina, Olympiakos Nicosia, Enosis Neon Paralimni, PAS Giannina, AS Lamia, APOP Kinyras Peyias and Aris Limassol

External links
 

1975 births
Living people
Nea Salamis Famagusta FC players
Anorthosis Famagusta F.C. players
Olympiakos Nicosia players
Enosis Neon Paralimni FC players
PAS Giannina F.C. players
APOP Kinyras FC players
Aris Limassol FC players
Cypriot footballers
Cyprus international footballers
Greek Cypriot people
Association football defenders
Sportspeople from Limassol